The following is a list of football clubs in The Bahamas.

 Western Warriors
 Bears FC
 Caledonia Celtic
 United FC
 FC Nassau
 Cavalier FC
 Dynamos FC
 Caledonia Thistle
 Baha Juniors FC
 Lyford Cay
 Renegades 

Bahamas
 
Football clubs
Football clubs